Neohebestola parvula is a species of beetle in the family Cerambycidae. It was described by Blanchard in 1851. It is known from Chile.

References

Forsteriini
Beetles described in 1851
Endemic fauna of Chile